Susan "Sue" Marie Nattrass,  (born November 5, 1950) is a Canadian trap shooter and medical researcher in osteoporosis. She was born in Medicine Hat, Alberta. Competing at an elite international level from the 1970s through the 2010s, Nattrass has had multiple appearances, in one or both of trap or double trap, at Olympic Games, Commonwealth Games, World Championships, and Pan American Games. Nattrass is a repeat World Champion and repeat medalist at the Commonwealth Games, World Championships, and Pan American Games.  She was the flag bearer for Canada at the 2007 Pan American Games (and a gold medal winner) and the 2014 Commonwealth Games.

As of the 2012 Olympics, Nattrass is one of only 122 athletes (and one of only 46 still active), all sports, to compete in at least six Olympic Games, appearing in 1976, '88, '92, 2000, '04 and '08. She won a gold medal at the World Championships in 1974, '75, '77, '78, '79, '81, and 2006.

Beginnings
She was introduced to trap shooting by her father Floyd Nattrass, who competed for Canada at the World Championships in 1958 and 1968 and at the Olympics in 1964. Nattrass said of her father:
"While other kids would go to the lake for the summer, we always went to trap shoots. My dad started when I was 5; we'd go to shoots, and I did everything I could do be a part of it. Then when I turned 12, he taught me how to shoot."

Olympics and Commonwealth Games
In the 1976 Summer Olympics she became the first ever woman to participate in a shooting event at the Olympics, as shooting was open to both sexes until 1992. She won a silver medal at the 2001 world championships in Cairo, Egypt in the trap event. She finished 9th in the 2000 Summer Olympics and 6th in the 2004 Summer Olympics in women's trap shooting.

At the 2006 Commonwealth Games Nattrass won three medals: two silver in women's double trap pairs and women's trap pairs and a bronze in women's trap.

She won the Trap Shooting event at the World Championships in 1981 and 2006, twenty-five years apart.

After the 1996 Summer Olympics, the International Shooting Union decided to discontinue the trap and skeet shooting events for women and instead allow women to compete in the double trap, where two clay saucers are thrown simultaneously. This is a difficult transition that Nattrass - who won two World Cups in the double trap in 1993 - equated to a downhill skier having to switch to cross-country. She led a campaign - writing letters, doing surveys, playing politics - against the decision to remove the two events. After five years, the campaign succeeded and women's skeet and trap shooting remained in the Olympics.

In 1981, she was awarded the Lou Marsh Trophy as Canadian Athlete of the Year and was made an Officer of the Order of Canada. She is also listed as a recipient of the Vanier Award for Outstanding Young Canadians.

She has travelled around the world at various competitions for over three decades, nearly always accompanied by her mother and coach Marie.

 Nattrass serves on the board of directors, Sections Chairs of the Shooting Federation of Canada.

Education and research
Nattrass earned a bachelor's degree in Physical Education from the University of Alberta in 1972 and a Masters in 1974, and has since been an instructor, administrator, lecturer and consultant in physical education and sports psychology. In between her first and second Olympic appearances in 1976 and 1988, she earned her doctorate from the University of Alberta in 1987.

Since 1996, Nattrass has lived on Vashon Island near Seattle. She moved there when she joined the Pacific Medical Center as a medical researcher in September 1996. She owns and runs the Puget Sound Osteoporosis Center, where she studies the effects of aging in bones on active sportswomen in their forties and older, takes part in clinical trials, and provides pro-bono screenings in the community.

Awards and achievements 

 Shooting Federation of Canada, Female Athlete of the Year - 1993, 2000, 2001, 2005, 2006, 2007, 2008, 2009
Washington State Trapshooting Hall of Fame - 2017
Seven-time Women's World Trapshooting Champion 1974 – 1981, 2006
World record holder Women's Trapshooting 1974 – 1989; Double Trap 1993
Six-time Olympian – 1976, 1988, 1992, 2000, 2004, 2008 Canadian Olympic teams
Two-time gold medalist Women's Double Trap World Cups 1993
Four-time silver medalist at World Championships 1971, 1982
U.I.T. silver medalist at 1995 Pan American Games
Winner of a Canadian Championship for 43 years
Silver medalist World Cups: 2000; Bronze medalist World Cups: 2000, 2001
Two-time silver and three-time bronze medalist at Commonwealth Games - 2002, 2006, and 2010
Gold medalist at Pan American Games 2007
Bronze medalist at World Championships 2005
University of Alberta Alumni Award 2004
Bronze medalist Pan American Games 2003
Silver medalist at World Championships 2001
Inducted into the Amateur Trapshooting Association's Hall of Fame 1998
Canada's Female Athlete of the Year 1977 & 1981
Silver medalist at World Championships 1991
Great Canadian Award 1990
Inducted into Edmonton's Sports Hall of Fame 2000
U.I.T. gold medalist at 1988 Olympics
Mayor's Silver Ribbon Award 1987
One of Edmonton YWCA's Women of the Year 1987
Bronze medalist at World Championships 1986
Inducted into University of Alberta's Wall of Fame 1985
Bronze medalist at World Championships 1985
One of the Five Outstanding Young Canadians 1983
Bronze medalist at World Championships 1983
Premier's Award (Alberta Athlete of the Year) 1982
Silver medalist at World Championships 1982
Edmonton's Amateur Athlete of the Year 1981
Inducted into Alberta Sports Hall of Fame 1980 
Ontario Athlete of the Year 1977
Inducted into Canadian Sports Hall of Fame 1977
Inducted into Canadian Olympic Association Hall of Fame 1975
Canadian Athlete Reference - The Canadian Encyclopedia

Results in World Championships

See also
 List of athletes with the most appearances at Olympic Games

References

External links
 
 Susan Marie Nattrass at The Canadian Encyclopedia
 
 
 
 

1950 births
Living people
Canadian female sport shooters
Canadian people of English descent
Olympic shooters of Canada
Shooters at the 1976 Summer Olympics
Shooters at the 1988 Summer Olympics
Shooters at the 1992 Summer Olympics
Shooters at the 2000 Summer Olympics
Shooters at the 2004 Summer Olympics
Shooters at the 2008 Summer Olympics
Pan American Games medalists in shooting
Pan American Games gold medalists for Canada
Pan American Games bronze medalists for Canada
Shooters at the 1999 Pan American Games
Shooters at the 2007 Pan American Games
Shooters at the 2011 Pan American Games
Shooters at the 2015 Pan American Games
Commonwealth Games medallists in shooting
Commonwealth Games silver medallists for Canada
Commonwealth Games bronze medallists for Canada
Shooters at the 2014 Commonwealth Games
Lou Marsh Trophy winners
Officers of the Order of Canada
Sportspeople from Alberta
Trap and double trap shooters
People from Medicine Hat
University of Alberta alumni
People from Vashon, Washington
Medalists at the 1999 Pan American Games
Medalists at the 2007 Pan American Games
20th-century Canadian women
Medallists at the 2010 Commonwealth Games